Saussignac is a commune in the Dordogne department in Nouvelle-Aquitaine in southwestern France. It is in the heart of Bergerac wine country and produces sweet white wines. Its village centre has a Poste and Mairie. The village is surrounded by several smaller communes each of which produce their own wines.

Population

See also
Saussignac AOC
Communes of the Dordogne département

References

External links

 

Communes of Dordogne